The Twilight Saga: Eclipse (Original Motion Picture Soundtrack), commonly referred to as Eclipse (Original Motion Picture Soundtrack), is the official soundtrack to Eclipse, released on June 8, 2010.

The soundtrack was once again co-produced by Alexandra Patsavas, the music supervisor for the previous two films. The track list for the album was revealed in a special MySpace revelation on May 12, 2010. The third soundtrack in The Twilight Saga series, the album debuted at number two on the U.S. Billboard 200 albums chart with sales of 146,000 copies.

The score for film, The Twilight Saga: Eclipse (The Score), commonly referred to as Eclipse (The Score), released on June 29, 2010, was composed, orchestrated and conducted by Academy Award winner Howard Shore.

Singles
The Twilight Saga: Eclipse (Original Motion Picture Soundtrack) generated three singles. "Neutron Star Collision (Love Is Forever)", by British band Muse, was released on May 17, 2010. The second single "Eclipse (All Yours)", by Canadian band Metric, released on May 25, 2010. While the third and final single, "Heavy in Your Arms", by English indie rock band Florence + the Machine, was released on November 15, 2010.

Track listing
The track list was revealed during a special all-day reveal event on the album's MySpace page. It followed the formula of the previous albums, including the songs used in the film ended off by one score track from the score album.

Just like in the soundtracks for both "Twilight" and "New Moon", the band Muse features on the album, along with artists such as Sia, The Black Keys and Cee Lo Green being included.

Reception

According to Metacritic, the soundtrack has received a weighted mean of 76, indicating "generally favorable reviews". It has generally been better reviewed than the soundtrack for New Moon, which received a score of 70, however, Entertainment Weekly gave New Moon a grade of A, whereas Eclipse was given a B+. Conversely, Allmusic gave the soundtrack for Eclipse a better rating than that for New Moon, awarding it 4 stars out of 5 rather than the previous soundtrack, which received only 2.

Chart performance
The soundtrack debuted at number two on the U.S. Billboard 200 albums chart behind Glee: The Music, Journey to Regionals with sales of 146,000 copies, making it the second soundtrack in the Twilight series that did not debut at number one on the U.S. Billboard 200, and the first that never hit number one. It peaked at #4 on the German albums chart. In Mexico, the album peaked at #4 on the international albums chart and at #7 on the overall chart. As of December 2010, the album has sold 517,000 copies in the U.S. and more than one million copies worldwide.

Charts and certifications

Weekly charts

Year-end charts

Certifications

Accolades
2010 Teen Choice Awards:
Teen Choice Awards for Choice Love Song: "Neutron Star Collision (Love Is Forever)" by Muse (Nominated)
2010 American Music Awards:
American Music Awards: Soundtracks – Favourite Album (Nominated)

The Twilight Saga: Eclipse (The Score)

Howard Shore composed the score for the film, following Alexandre Desplat, who scored New Moon, and Carter Burwell, who scored Twilight. "Eclipse (All Yours)" from the soundtrack is included on the score album as part of the cue, "Wedding Plans". The score album debuted and peaked at #20 on Billboard 200, higher than the previous The Twilight Saga score albums (the Twilight score charted at #65 and the New Moon at #80).

Track listing

References

External links

The Twilight Saga (film series) soundtracks
2010 soundtrack albums
2010s film soundtrack albums
Chop Shop Records soundtracks
Howard Shore soundtracks
Romance film soundtracks
Fantasy film soundtracks